Road locomotive could refer to:

 A type of (steam-powered) traction engine, usually referring to those designed for heavy haulage on common roads
Showman's road locomotive, a form of the steam-powered road locomotive adapted and decorated for use hauling and powering funfair rides
 A ballast tractor, the modern diesel-powered equivalent of the steam road locomotive
 (US) A railway locomotive intended for hauling freight trains between terminals (as opposed to switching within a yard)
 An early, experimental steam-powered road vehicle, such as Richard Trevithick's Puffing Devil. The term is often used to describe such vehicles that cannot be readily classified as 'carriages', 'wagons', or 'automobiles', for example. (See History of steam road vehicles.)

See also 

 Lombard Steam Log Hauler

Steam road vehicles